Osire is a refugee camp in central Namibia, situated 200 km north of the capital Windhoek next to the main road C30 from Gobabis to Otjiwarongo. It was established in 1992 to accommodate refugees from Angola, Burundi, the Democratic Republic of the Congo, Rwanda and Somalia. The camp grew quickly in its early years, reaching a peak of 20,000 inhabitants in 1998. Since then the refugee population of Osire decreased steadily, approaching 6,500 in 2010, and 3,000 in 2014. Due to the cessation of conflicts in the countries where inhabitants originate from, the camp is scheduled to close. In 2008 the majority (75%) of refugees still resident here came from Angola, and a sizeable portion from the Democratic Republic of the Congo. UNHCR regards the camp as one of the best managed in the world, due to its provisioning of formal school education, both primary and secondary. The settlement further has a police station and a clinic.

The camp used to be a detention centre during the South African rule over Namibian territory. Throughout its existence as refugee camp maltreatment of inhabitants, retaliation, harassment and riots have been reported. In 2009 a group of 41 people fled the camp with the help of a local Human Rights organisation after allegedly having received death threats. This group left Namibia via the Mamuno Border Post but was refused entry to Botswana and as a result stayed in No Man's Land between Namibia and Botswana for three months until being arrested by Botswana authorities and deported to the Democratic Republic of the Congo.

References

Populated places in the Otjozondjupa Region
Refugee camps in Africa
Populated places established in 1992
1992 establishments in Namibia